Old Bones of the River is a comedy film released in 1938 starring British actor Will Hay with Moore Marriott and Graham Moffatt and directed by Marcel Varnel, based on the characters created by Edgar Wallace. The film is a spoof of the 1935 movie Sanders of the River.

Synopsis
Hay plays Professor Benjamin Tibbetts,  representative of the Teaching & Welfare Institution for the Reformation of Pagans (otherwise known as T.W.I.R.P for short), and dedicated to spreading education amongst the natives of colonial Africa.
Professor Tibbetts is the uncle of Wallace's character Lt Tibbetts, known as "Bones", so the Professor is referred to as "Old Bones".

As he arrives (still trying to learn the native language via recordings), Professor Tibbetts is tricked into sneaking a gin still into the country by Prince M'Bapi, half-brother of Bosambo, chief of the Ochori tribe. The steamer that brings him takes Commissioner Sanders on leave, with Captain Hamilton taking over his duties.
 
Later, Tibbetts makes his way to Kombooli High, where his students wear Eton collars alongside their native garb. Tibbetts dons a mortarboard but wears safari shorts under his gown owing to the heat.

When Hamilton falls ill with a dose of malaria, Tibbetts is forced to take over his duties, which include collecting the taxes. Travelling upriver by canoe, he finds Sanders' paddlesteamer the Zaire, operated by Harbottle (Moore Marriott) and Albert (Graham Moffatt).

M'Bapi leads a revolt against Bosambo, and the threesome rescue a baby from death by sacrifice.

Cast
Will Hay as Professor Benjamin Tibbetts
Moore Marriott as Jerry Harbottle
Graham Moffatt as Albert
Robert Adams as Bosambo
Jack London as M'Bapi
Wyndham Goldie as Commissioner Sanders
Jack Livesey as Captain Hamilton

Notes

External links
 

1938 films
1938 comedy films
British black-and-white films
British comedy films
British Empire
1930s English-language films
Films directed by Marcel Varnel
Films set in Africa
Films set in the British Empire
Films with screenplays by Marriott Edgar
1930s British films